Ralph Montgomery Easley (1856–1939) was an American journalist and political organizer.  He was Director of the American political reform group, the National Civic Federation.

Easley was born in Frederick, Illinois, but moved to Hutchinson, Kansas, in 1875, where he was a public school teacher, postmaster, and newspaper reporter. In 1883, he purchased and began editing the Hutchinson Daily News until 1891. In 1891, became a key figure in the Illinois Republican Party. Both of these positions served as important stepping stones in Easley’s career as a reformer and civic booster. His tenure as editor lasted until 1891, when Easley left Kansas and made his way back to Illinois. Here, he took charge of the “politicoeconomic department” of the Chicago Inter Ocean, one of the Middle West’s leading urban newspapers. This position, which involved creating and administering employee welfare programs, put Easley in contact with many of Chicago’s leading civic reformers, and business, political, and labor leaders. In 1893 he became a founder and secretary of the political reform group, the Chicago Civic Federation.  In 1900, he left Chicago to found the National Civic Federation in New York, where he was the chairman of the executive council throughout the federation’s forty-five-year history

In 1917, he married Gertrude Beeks Easley who continued to work with him at the National Civic Federation.

See also

 Blair Coan
 Elizabeth Dilling
 Nesta Helen Webster
 Hamilton Fish
 David George Plotkin

References
 Christopher J. Cyphers; The National Civic Federation and the Making of a New Liberalism, 1900-1915 Praeger. 2002.

External links
National Civic Federation Records, 1894-1949 (PDF) at the New York Public Library

1856 births
1939 deaths
American activists
American male journalists
People from Hutchinson, Kansas
Writers from Kansas
Illinois Republicans
Kansas Republicans
New York (state) Republicans